James Matthew Maxon (January 1, 1875 – November 8, 1948) was the fourth bishop of the Episcopal Diocese of Tennessee, serving in that capacity from 1935 to January 1, 1947.

Biography
Maxon was born on January 1, 1875, in Bay City, Michigan, the son of Daniel Marshman Maxson and Anna McKinney. He was ordained deacon and priest in 1907. He was ordained priest by Bishop M. Edward Fawcett. He became rector of Christ Church in Nashville, Tennessee. He was elected Coadjutor Bishop of Tennessee on June 21, 1922, at a special convention of the diocese in Christ Church Nashville, Tennessee. He was consecrated on October 18, 1922, by Thomas F. Gailor, Bishop of Tennessee. He succeeded as Bishop of Tennessee in 1935 and was installed on November 3, 1935, in St. Mary's Episcopal Cathedral in Memphis, Tennessee. Bishop Maxon was instrumental in facilitating the merger of Grace Church and St. Luke's Church in Memphis, to form Grace-St. Luke's Episcopal Church in 1940. He resigned on January 1, 1947, and died on November 8, 1948, in Memphis, Tennessee.

References 
"Bishop Maxon Dies" in The Living Church, November 21, 1948, p. 5.

American Episcopal priests
1875 births
1948 deaths
19th-century Anglican bishops in the United States
Episcopal bishops of Tennessee
People from Bay City, Michigan